Kevin Meredith Carton (26 October 1933 – 3 August 2017) was an Indian-born Australian field hockey player. He competed at the 1956 Summer Olympics and the 1960 Summer Olympics.

References

External links
 

1933 births
2017 deaths
Sportspeople from Lucknow
Field hockey players from Uttar Pradesh
Australian male field hockey players
Olympic field hockey players of Australia
Field hockey players at the 1956 Summer Olympics
Field hockey players at the 1960 Summer Olympics
Anglo-Indian people
Indian emigrants to Australia
Australian people of Anglo-Indian descent
Australian sportspeople of Indian descent